Aleksander Aleksandrovich "Sasha" Barkov (born 2 September 1995) is a Finnish professional ice hockey centre and captain of the Florida Panthers of the National Hockey League (NHL). Barkov was selected by the Panthers in the first round, second overall, of the 2013 NHL Entry Draft. He is the son of former Russian hockey player Alexander Barkov Sr. and holds dual Finnish and Russian citizenship. Barkov is regarded as an elite two-way centre and one of the best defensive forwards in hockey, winning the Frank J. Selke Trophy in 2021.

Barkov was born and raised in Tampere, Finland, where his father was playing for Tappara of the Finnish SM-Liiga at the time. Barkov joined Tappara’s junior system and started his professional career with the club in the Finnish Elite League.

Playing career

Liiga
Barkov made his debut in SM-liiga with Tappara on 1 October 2011 and became the youngest player in the league to score a point, with his assist on a goal by Kalle Kaijomaa. The 37-year old record was previously held by Juha Jyrkkiö.

During the 2012–13 season, Barkov suffered a season-ending shoulder injury which required surgery, and he was forced to sit out the rest of the playoffs and the fitness portion of the NHL Combine. Despite this, the final ranking from the NHL Central Scouting Bureau for the 2013 NHL Entry Draft was first overall for international skaters. Barkov was eventually drafted second overall by the Florida Panthers.

Florida Panthers	
On 15 July 2013, Barkov signed his first NHL contract with the Florida Panthers. He became the youngest player since the 1967 NHL expansion to score a goal on 3 October 2013, which he did it in a road game against Kari Lehtonen of the Dallas Stars at the age of 18 years and 31 days. Jordan Staal had previously held that record (for the post-expansion era), scoring his first NHL goal at the age of 18 years and 32 days.

In the midst of a successful 2015–16 season in which he was ultimately named a Lady Byng Memorial Trophy finalist (which he would lose to Anže Kopitar), on 26 January 2016, the Panthers signed Barkov to a new six-year, $35.4 million contract effective from the 2016–17 season through to the 2021–22 season.

The 2017–18 season saw Barkov reach many NHL milestones. He recorded career-highs in assists and points and was invited to the NHL All-Star Game for the first time in his career. He was again named a Lady Byng Memorial Trophy finalist after the 2017–18 season, accumulating only 14 minutes in penalties, which he would lose to William Karlsson.

On 17 September 2018, Barkov was named the Panthers' captain, replacing Derek MacKenzie. On 15 December, in a 4–3 overtime win over the Toronto Maple Leafs, Barkov scored his first career NHL hat-trick. He scored his second career NHL hat-trick on 17 February 2019 in a 6–3 win over the Montreal Canadiens. On 8 March 2019, in a 6–2 Panthers win over the Minnesota Wild, Barkov become the first Panther to record five assists in a one game. On April 18, for the third-straight season, Barkov was named a finalist for the Lady Byng Memorial Trophy, alongside Ryan O'Reilly and Sean Monahan. On 20 June, Barkov was named the winner of the trophy, accumulating just four minor penalties during the 2018–19 season.

On 8 October 2021, Barkov signed an eight-year, $80 million contract extension with the Panthers. He was nominated for the Selke Trophy for the second consecutive season.

International play

In December 2011, Barkov was chosen to play for Finland as the youngest Finnish player in the Ice Hockey World Junior Championships. During the quarter-final match on 2 January 2012 against Slovakia, Barkov became the second-youngest player to score a goal at the World Juniors at the age of 16 years and 4 months. The record is held by Kazakhstan's Viktor Alexandrov, who set the record in 2001 at age 15.

Barkov was invited to the 2014 Winter Olympics in Sochi to represent Finland, but suffered a knee injury after two games and was unable to continue playing in the tournament.

In 2016, Barkov and then-Florida teammate Jussi Jokinen were selected to represent Finland at the 2016 IIHF World Championship. Finland won silver after a 2–0 loss to Canada. Barkov ended the tournament with nine points in nine games.

Personal life
Barkov's father Alexander Sr. played hockey in Russia, Italy and Finland, spending the last ten seasons of his career with Tappara. When Barkov Sr. ended his professional career with Tappara, the family decided to reside in Tampere. Barkov's mother is also Russian; he also has one older brother, Juri. Finnish and Russian are Barkov's native languages; he speaks Russian at home and Finnish elsewhere. He became fluent in English while living in North America during the NHL season.  During the regular season, he resides in Boca Raton, Florida with his mother Olga, and in his hometown of Tampere in the summer, where he owns a lakeside villa. Barkov welcomed a baby boy in December 2021

He is a supporter of A.C. Milan.

Career statistics

Regular season and playoffs

International

Awards and honours

References

External links

 

1995 births
Finnish expatriate ice hockey players in the United States
Finnish ice hockey centres
Finnish people of Russian descent
Florida Panthers draft picks
Florida Panthers players
Frank Selke Trophy winners
Ice hockey players at the 2014 Winter Olympics
Ice hockey people from Tampere
Lady Byng Memorial Trophy winners
Living people
Medalists at the 2014 Winter Olympics
National Hockey League All-Stars
National Hockey League first-round draft picks
Olympic bronze medalists for Finland
Olympic ice hockey players of Finland
Olympic medalists in ice hockey
Tappara players